The Daily Herald is a daily newspaper that covers news and community events in Utah County, central Utah. Much of the coverage focuses on the Provo-Orem metropolitan area in Utah Valley.

The Daily Herald is owned by Ogden Newspapers. The paper has a daily circulation of 32,000, with a Thursday circulation of 42,000 and a Sunday circulation of 36,000. It also owns nine community publications in Utah and Sanpete counties.

History
The earliest predecessor of the Daily Herald, the Provo Daily Times, was founded in 1873. It was the first newspaper to be published in Provo, when Utah was still a frontier territory. The paper eventually changed its name to the Enquirer, and then to the Provo Post. A competitor, the Utah County Democrat, was founded in 1898 and renamed the Provo Herald in 1909. In 1924 the Provo Post and the Provo Herald merged, forming a final foundation for the later Daily Herald. The company was purchased in 1926 by James G. Scripps, eldest son of newspaper magnate E. W. Scripps. Scripps League Newspapers held the newspaper until 1996, when it was sold to Pulitzer, which held it for almost a decade. In 2005 Pulitzer was sold to Lee Enterprises.

In February 2009, the Daily Herald announced it would discontinue five weekly papers that had covered northern Utah County: the American Fork Citizen, Pleasant Grove Review, Lehi Free Press, Lone Peak Press and Orem Times. Subscribers to those papers, which were published every Thursday and had a combined circulation of 5,800, instead began receiving Thursday issues of the Herald, leading to a higher subscription count that day. At that time the weekly papers in southern Utah County were not affected.  However, by January 2011, it announced that it would entirely discontinue the weekly newspapers that covered southern Utah County (Springville Herald, Spanish Fork Press, and Nebo Reporter) and incorporate their content into daily publication of the Daily Herald.  By April 2013, the online editions of all the northern Utah County publications, except the American Fork Citizen have been discontinued. However, an online edition of The Pyramid (Mount Pleasant in Sanpete County) is also published.

In February 2013, the Daily Herald announced that it would no longer publish a daily opinion page.  This change came shortly after 10 percent of its workforce, including the executive editor, was laid off. As of May 2013, a replacement executive editor, nor an interim executive editor, had not been identified, leaving the possibility that the position may be permanently eliminated.

In April 2014, Bob Williams was named publisher,  and in September 2015, the Daily Herald named Scott Tittrington and Jordan Carroll as co-managing editors. In 2016, Lee Enterprises sold the Daily Herald to Ogden Newspapers.

Notes

References

External links

 

Newspapers published in Utah
Companies based in Utah
Daily Herald
Publications established in 1873
1873 establishments in Utah Territory